Mohamed Azzaoui (born December 1, 1975, in Mostaganem) is a retired amateur boxer from Algeria, who is best known for winning the gold medal in the men's heavyweight division (– 91 kg) at the 1999 All-Africa Games in Johannesburg, South Africa. He represented his native country at the 2000 Summer Olympics in Sydney, Australia, where he was defeated in the first round by Jackson Chanet from France. He is also a former New Zealand and Pan Asian Boxing Association cruiserweight champion.

Career 
 participant Olympic Games 2000 ( Sydney, Australia ) (– 91 kg)
  African Amateur Boxing Championships 1998 (  Algiers, Algeria )  (+91 kg)
  All-Africa Games 1999 ( Johannesburg, South Africa)  (– 91 kg)
  Pan Arab Games 1999 (Amman, Jordan)  (– 91 kg)

International tournaments 
  Copengahen Cup - 1999 (– 91 kg)
  Giraldo Cordova Cardin Tournament ( Santa Clara, Cuba) 1999  (– 91 kg)
  Giraldo Cordova Cardin Tournament (Havana, Cuba ) 1998 (– 91 kg)

Professional boxing record

External links

1975 births
Living people
New Zealand professional boxing champions
Heavyweight boxers
Boxers at the 2000 Summer Olympics
Olympic boxers of Algeria
People from Mostaganem
New Zealand people of Algerian descent
Algerian male boxers
African Games gold medalists for Algeria
African Games medalists in boxing
Competitors at the 1999 All-Africa Games